WLAW-FM (97.5 MHz, "97.5 Nash Icon") is a radio station broadcasting a country music format. Licensed to Whitehall, Michigan, the station serves the Muskegon, Michigan market. The station's programming was derived from Cumulus Media Networks' Hits & Favorites format until Westwood One took over. It is heard as far as Grand Rapids, Michigan, east of US-131, and it experiences interference from WJIM-FM from Lansing. It is now affiliated with Westwood One's country program.

History
The station began broadcasting in 1991 as WPBK-FM with a satellite-fed country format from Unistar Radio Networks, and became WEFG-FM ("Frog") soon afterward. In 1995, WEFG-FM's format changed to a 1970s-based classic hits format (as Eagle 97.5) satellite-fed from Westwood One. In 1999, Westwood One discontinued its 1970s hits format in favor of Rhythmic Oldies (tagged as "Groovin' Oldies"), and WEFG-FM continued with this format until switching back to country (as "Kickin' Country") in 2002 and then to sports in 2005.

On December 14, 2010, just four days after it was announced that Clear Channel/Muskegon would replace WSHZ's Adult Contemporary format with WMUS and its Country format, WEFG-FM dropped its Sports format as "The Champ" to pick up WSHZ's former one as "Sunny FM" WWSN. This marked the second time since 1996 that another station had used the "Sunny" moniker other than WSNX, whose call letters once matched that handle. Sister station WVIB was known as Sunny FM for a time until 2004.

On April 1, 2019, the WWSN call sign and its "Sunny" adult contemporary format moved to 92.5 FM Newaygo, swapping frequencies with country-formatted WLAW, which moved to 97.5 FM Whitehall. On August 24, 2021, the station changed its call sign to WLAW-FM.

Previous logo

References

External links
Official website
Michiguide.com - WEFG-FM History

LAW-FM
Country radio stations in the United States
Cumulus Media radio stations
Radio stations established in 1992
1992 establishments in Michigan